Guilherme Oliveira also known as Gui (born 8 January 1985) is a Brazilian handball player who competed in the 2008 Summer Olympics.

Achievements
Pan American Men's Club Handball Championship:
2015, 2016, 2018
South and Central American Men's Club Handball Championship:2019''

References

1985 births
Living people
Brazilian male handball players
Olympic handball players of Brazil
Handball players at the 2008 Summer Olympics
Handball players at the 2007 Pan American Games
Pan American Games medalists in handball
Pan American Games gold medalists for Brazil
Medalists at the 2007 Pan American Games
21st-century Brazilian people